Group B of the MŽRKL took place between 7 October 2015 and it will end on 23 December 2015.

The three best ranked teams advanced to the League 6.

Standings

Fixtures and results
All times given below are in Central European Time.

Game 1

Game 2

Game 3

Game 4

Game 5

Game 6

Game 7

Game 8

Game 9

Game 10

External links
Official website
MŽRKL 2015–16 Group B at srbijasport.net

Group B
2015–16 in Bosnia and Herzegovina basketball
2015–16 in Montenegrin basketball
2015–16 in Croatian basketball
2015–16 in Slovenian basketball